Palaea may refer to:

Pleiae, a town of ancient Laconia, Greece
Philaea, a town of ancient Cilicia, Asia Minor, now in Turkey
Palaia Fokaia, former community and a seaside town in East Attica, Greece
Palaea Historica, a ninth-century Byzantine chronicle

See also
Palaia (disambiguation)